Pere Martí Castelló (born 22 January 1982) is a Spanish  football coach and a former player who played mainly as a defensive midfielder.

Football career
Born in Moncofa, Province of Castellón, Martí made his La Liga debut in the 2003–04 season with Villarreal CF, featuring heavily as the team finished eighth and scoring his only goal in a 2–1 away win against RCD Mallorca, on 18 April 2004. He added nine matches in their quarter-final run in the UEFA Cup, but was soon deemed surplus to requirements and left for neighbours Elche CF, in the second division.

After one shaky debut campaign, Martí became an essential first-team element with Elche. At the end of 2007–08 he joined Málaga CF, which had just returned to the top level; however, mainly because of injuries, he wasn't part of manager Antonio Tapia's plans in his first year.

In late August 2009, Martí was loaned to Real Murcia of division two, appearing very rarely as the side was relegated. On 13 July 2010, he was released from contract from Málaga and immediately joined CD Castellón, freshly relegated to the third tier.

On 4 January 2011, aged only 28, Martí announced his retirement from professional football, citing his multiple injuries as the main reason. He subsequently rejoined his first club Villarreal, acting as youth coach.

Managerial statistics

Honours
Villarreal
UEFA Intertoto Cup: 2003

References

External links

1982 births
Living people
People from Plana Baixa
Sportspeople from the Province of Castellón
Spanish footballers
Footballers from the Valencian Community
Association football midfielders
La Liga players
Segunda División players
Segunda División B players
Villarreal CF B players
Villarreal CF players
Elche CF players
Málaga CF players
Real Murcia players
CD Castellón footballers
Spanish football managers